Larry Porter may refer to:
 Larry Porter (American football) (born 1972), American football coach
 Larry Porter (musician) (born 1951), American jazz musician and composer